"A Noble Was Born in Chaos" is the second single by Versailles. The single was distributed exclusively at a concert at Shibuya-AX on March 19, 2008.  All three songs would later be on the band's debut album Noble.

Track listing

References

Versailles (band) songs
2008 singles
2008 songs
Songs written by Kamijo (musician)